Oh, Dear Augustine is a 1922 Austrian silent film directed by Hans Karl Breslauer and starring Willi Forst. It takes its title from the popular Viennese song "Oh du lieber Augustin".

Cast

References

Bibliography

External links

1922 films
Austrian silent feature films
Austrian black-and-white films
Films directed by Hans Karl Breslauer
Films scored by Edmund Eysler